Robert Milton Young, usually known as Robert M. Young (born November 22, 1924), is an American film director, cinematographer, screenwriter, and producer. In 1985 he was a member of the jury at the 14th Moscow International Film Festival.  He has frequently cast Edward James Olmos in his movies, directing him in Alambrista! (1977), The Ballad of Gregorio Cortez (1982), Saving Grace (1986), Triumph of the Spirit (1989), Talent for the Game (1991), Roosters (1993), Slave of Dreams (1995) and Caught (1996). He produced Olmos's directorial debut, American Me (1992).

Early life and education 
Young was born in New York City in 1924. His father was a cameraman who later owned a film laboratory. Robert began college at MIT to become a chemical engineer. He left after two years to join the Navy in World War II and served in the Pacific in New Guinea and in the Philippines. Upon returning to America after the war he decided to study English literature at Harvard University.

He also developed an interest in filmmaking and graduated from Harvard University in 1949.

Early career 
After graduation, Young formed a cooperative partnership with two friends making educational films. In 1960, he worked for NBC making public affairs programs for NBC White Paper. In 1960, on behalf of NBC, he went to the American South to make the film Sit-In about the civil rights protests and sit-ins. The film won a Peabody Award.

He later left NBC to pursue narrative film work.

Filmography

Filmmaking credits

Feature films

Documentaries 

Canselled film: Cortile Cascino (1962)

Television

Technical credits

Feature films

Documentaries and other

Television

References

Further reading 
 Lewis, Leon (editor). Robert M. Young : essays on the films, Jefferson, N.C. ; London : McFarland & Co., 2005.

External links
 
 "Robert M. Young Filmography", Fandango
 A Tribute to Robert M. Young at Cinequest
 Robert M. Young at the Cannes Festival

1924 births
Living people
American cinematographers
Film producers from New York (state)
American male screenwriters
American television directors
Emmy Award winners
George Polk Award recipients
Writers from New York City
Peabody Award winners
Harvard University alumni
MIT School of Engineering alumni
Film directors from New York City
Screenwriters from New York (state)
Directors of Caméra d'Or winners
United States Navy personnel of World War II